Lahoh (  or  ,) ), is a spongy, flat pancake-like bread that originated from Somalia. It is a type of flat bread eaten regularly in Somalia, Djibouti, Ethiopia and Yemen. Yemenite Jewish immigrants popularized the dish in Israel. It is called Laxoox/Lahoh or Canjeero/Canjeelo in Somaliland, Somalia and Djibouti, and called Lahoh/Lahuh in Yemen, respectively.

Preparation

Lahoh is traditionally and typically prepared from a thick batter of sorghum flour (preferred flour for making Laxoox), White cornmeal/cornflour, warm water, yeast, and a pinch of salt. The mixture is beaten by hand until soft and creamy. The batter is then left to ferment overnight to cook and then eat for breakfast. There is a sweet-tasting variety of the dish, one made with eggs, as well as another variety that is spiced and typically eaten in Somali households at breakfast during Eid called Cambaabuur (Ambaabuur).
It is traditionally baked on a metallic circular stove called a taawa. Lacking that, it can also be baked in an ordinary pan.

Regional consumption

In Somalia, Djibouti, and in parts of Ethiopia and Kenya, for breakfast (which is where Lahoh is typically eaten), it is consumed with subag (a Somali butter/ghee), olive oil, sesame oil, and sugar or honey or “beer” (liver and onions), “suqaar” (stir-fry meat), or with “odkac/muqmad”. Occasionally it is eaten for lunch, which is when it is eaten with a Somali stew, soup, or curry. It is almost always consumed with Somali tea.

In Yemen, it is often sold on the street by peddlers. It can also be found in Israel, where it was introduced by Yemenite Jews who immigrated there.

See also

 Dosa
Uttappam
 Appam
 Baghrir
 Injera

References

Flatbreads
Arab cuisine
Middle Eastern cuisine
Yeast breads
Yemeni cuisine
Djiboutian cuisine
Israeli cuisine
Jewish cuisine
Jewish baked goods
Pancakes
Fermented foods
National dishes
Somali cuisine